Mai-Ester Murdmaa (born 31 March 1938) is an Estonian choreographer, ballet dancer, ballet master and director.

Murdmaa was born in Tallinn. Her older brother Ivar Murdmaa is a marine geologist and her younger brother Allan Murdmaa was an architect. Her sister Kai Murdmaa is a physicist.

In 1956 she graduated from the Tallinn Ballet School. In 1964 she graduated from GITIS in ballet master speciality. From 1956 until 1960, she was a dancer at the Estonia Theatre, after that, she was the ballet master (1964–1973) and principal ballet master (1974–2001) at the Estonia Theatre.

Murdmaa was married to Latvian pianist and music professor Valdis Jancis until his death in 2014. Their song is composer and musician Rainer Jancis and animator and musician Kaspar Jancis.

Awards
 2001: Order of the White Star, III class.

Filmography
 1974: Ooperiball (music film; scenarist)
 1980: Kadunud poeg (music film; director)
 1980: Medeia (music film; director)
 1984: Naine (music film; director)
 1987: Metsluiged (feature film; scenarist)

References

Living people
1938 births
Estonian ballet dancers
Ballet mistresses
Estonian choreographers
Estonian women film directors
Recipients of the Order of the White Star, 3rd Class
People from Tallinn